Season of Glass is the fifth studio album by Yoko Ono, her first solo recording after the murder of her husband John Lennon. Season of Glass, released in 1981, reached number 49 on the US Billboard 200 albums chart, making it Ono's highest-charting solo album to date.

A music video was created for "Goodbye Sadness" featuring footage of Lennon and Ono together. The video was screened on the first episode of Saturday Night Lives seventh season.

Background
The album was released less than six months after Lennon's death and deals with it directly in songs such as "Goodbye Sadness" and "I Don't Know Why". Lennon and Ono's son Sean Lennon features on "Even When You're Far Away", recounting a story his father used to tell him.

The front cover features Lennon's bloodstained glasses (the same ones that Lennon wore on the day of his death) positioned next to a half empty glass of water, with a view of Central Park in the background. The choice of album cover was considered controversial by the record company:

Reception

Season of Glass charted at number 49 on the Billboard 200, making it Ono's highest-charting solo album to date.

Billboard magazine gave the album a positive review, describing the album as Ono's "reaffirmation in life", containing a sense that she will "brave the crisis". Billboard also described the album as having "a minimum of quirks" and sounded more commercial than any of her previous albums. The songs "I Don't Know Why", "Goodbye Sadness", "Turn of the Wheel" and "She Gets Down on Her Knees" were chosen as the best cuts from the album.

Music journalist Robert Christgau stated that "damn near every song [on the album] is affecting". He described the transition from the "retrospective irony" of "Extension 33" to the "cut-off vulnerability" of "No, No, No" as "positively gut-wrenching".

In a review for the 1997 reissue, Ryan Schreiber of Pitchfork called the album "a landmark in musical history" that "[encapsulated] Yoko's sadness" as well as the sadness felt around the world by John Lennon's death. He added that the album showcased Ono's "remarkable strength" and described the bonus demo recording of "I Don't Know Why" on the reissue as "harrowing".

Pitchforks Jayson Greene reviewed the album a second time in 2023, giving it a higher score of 8.8 compared to the website's original 7.7 score in their 1997 review. Greene described the album as a "survivor's statement" and the song "I Don't Know Why" as "harrowing and plainspoken" and "Goodbye Sadness" as "heart-rending". He noted that the songs "Goodbye Sadness", "Toyboat", "Silver Horse" and "Mother of the Universe" featured Ono singing "gorgeous, long-breathed melodies [...] while the music gently rocks and sways". Greene stated that the songs on Season of Glass were "lullabies to hope, delivered with the beatific calm of a dying opera heroine's final aria". He did however feel that the omission of "Walking on Thin Ice" was "like a glitch in the historical record" and should have had a place on the album.

Pitchfork listed Season of Glass as one of the best 200 albums of the 1980s.

Reissue
The 1997 Rykodisc reissue added bonus tracks of the single "Walking on Thin Ice" and an a cappella demo of "I Don't Know Why", recorded the day after Lennon's death. Demos of Season of Glass songs recorded with Lennon in the 1970s were also released as bonus tracks with other Ono reissues, including acoustic versions of and "Dogtown" and "She Gets Down on Her Knees" on Approximately Infinite Universe, "Will You Touch Me" on Fly and "Extension 33" on A Story. The unreleased 1974 album A Story also contained several songs that were later re-recorded for Season of Glass, namely "Dogtown", "She Gets Down On Her Knees" and "Will You Touch Me". It was also released by Rykodisc in 1997.

Remixes
Three songs from this recording were reworked by other artists on the remix tribute album Yes, I'm a Witch in 2007. Anohni reworked "Toyboat", The Apples in Stereo reworked "Nobody Sees Me Like You Do" and Jason Pierce from Spiritualized reworked "Walking on Thin Ice".

In popular culture
Holly Miranda covered "Nobody Sees Me Like You Do" as a B-side to her single "Forest Green, Oh Forest Green" and on her EP Choose to See, which was included with the purchase of her 2010 album The Magician's Private Library.

Track listing

Personnel
Yoko Ono – vocals, cover photography, design
John Lennon – guitar, keyboards
Sean Ono Lennon – "A little story"
Hugh McCracken – guitar, Jew's harp on "Dogtown"
Earl Slick – guitar
George Small – keyboards
Tony Levin – bass guitar
John Siegler – bass guitar on "Mindweaver" and "Mother of the Universe"
Andy Newmark – drums
Arthur Jenkins Jr. – percussion
David Friedman – percussion, vibraphone
George "Young" Opalisky – soprano and alto saxophone
Michael Brecker – tenor saxophone
Ronnie Cuber – baritone saxophone
Howard Johnson – tuba
Tony Davilio – conductor, keyboards; guitar on "No, No, No" and "Toyboat"Technical'
Frederic Seaman, Jerry Caron – production assistant 
Ed Sprigg – engineer
Christopher Whorf – artwork

Charts

Release history

References

Yoko Ono albums
1981 albums
Albums produced by Phil Spector
Albums produced by Yoko Ono
Geffen Records albums
Rykodisc albums